The 19th National Film Awards, presented by Ministry of Information and Broadcasting, India to felicitate the best of Indian Cinema released in the year 1971.

Juries 
Four different committees were formed based on the film making sectors in India, mainly based in Bombay, Calcutta and Madras along with the central committee for all India level. For 19th National Film Awards.

 Jury Members: Central
 Jury Regional: Bombay
 Jury Regional: Calcutta
 Jury Regional: Madras

Awards 
Awards were divided into feature films and non-feature films.

President's Gold Medal for the All India Best Feature Film is now better known as National Film Award for Best Feature Film, whereas President's Gold Medal for the Best Documentary Film is analogous to today's National Film Award for Best Non-Feature Film. For children's films, Prime Minister's Gold Medal is now given as National Film Award for Best Children's Film. At the regional level, President's Silver Medal for Best Feature Film is now given as National Film Award for Best Feature Film in a particular language. Certificate of Merit in all the categories is discontinued over the years.

Lifetime Achievement Award

Feature films 

Feature films were awarded at All India as well as regional level. For 19th National Film Awards, a Bengali film Seemabadha won the President's Gold Medal for the All India Best Feature Film.

All India Award 

Following were the awards given:

Regional Award 

The awards were given to the best films made in the regional languages of India. For feature films in English, Gujarati, Kashmiri, Oriya and Punjabi language, President's Silver Medal for Best Feature Film was not given.

Non-Feature films 

Following were the awards given:

Short films

Awards not given 

Following were the awards not given as no film was found to be suitable for the award

 Best Story Writer
 Best Film on Family Welfare
 Best Experimental Film
 Best Animation Film
 President's Silver Medal for Best Feature Film in English
 President's Silver Medal for Best Feature Film in Oriya
 President's Silver Medal for Best Feature Film in Punjabi

References

External Links 
 National Film Awards Archives
 Official Page for Directorate of Film Festivals, India

National Film Awards (India) ceremonies
1971 film awards
1971 in Indian cinema